The 2022 South and Central American Men's Junior Handball Championship took place in Buenos Aires, Argentina at the La Casa del Handball Argentino, from 8 to 12 November 2022. It acted as the South and Central American qualifying tournament for the 2023 Men's Junior World Handball Championship.The tournament also serves as a qualification event for the Intercontinental Phase of the IHF Trophy.

Preliminary round
All times are local (UTC–3).

Group A

Group B

Knockout stage

Bracket

5–8th place bracket

5–8th place semifinals

Semifinals

Seventh place game

Fifth place game

Third place game

Final

Final standing

References

External links
Results

South and Central American Men's Junior Handball Championship
South and Central American Men's Junior Handball Championship
South and Central American Men's Junior Handball Championship
International handball competitions hosted by Argentina
Sports competitions in Buenos Aires
South and Central American Men's Junior Handball Championship